Christopher Eubanks and Evan King were the defending champions but only King chose to defend his title, partnering Nathan Pasha. King lost in the first round to Thanasi Kokkinakis and Matt Reid.

Marcelo Arévalo and Jeevan Nedunchezhiyan won the title after defeating Leander Paes and Miguel Ángel Reyes-Varela 6–1, 6–4 in the final.

Seeds

Draw

References
 Main Draw

Monterrey Challenger - Doubles